Greek National Road 14 (abbreviated as EO14) is a single carriageway road in northeastern Greece. It connects Drama with Xanthi, passing through Paranesti and Stavroupoli.

14
Roads in Eastern Macedonia and Thrace